Elaine Paige in Concert was a video recording of a concert performance at Birmingham Symphony Hall, which was part of Elaine Paige's 1991 UK tour.

The set list featured songs from her musical theatre, as well as a number of tracks from her 1991 album Love Can Do That.

Track listing

 "I Have Dreamed" (Richard Rodgers/Oscar Hammerstein II)
 "Anything Goes" (Cole Porter)
 "Love Can Do That" (Diane Warren)
 "Another Suitcase in Another Hall" (Tim Rice/Andrew Lloyd Webber)
 "Heart Don't Change My Mind" (Robbie Buchanan/Diane Warren)
 "The Rose" (Amanda McBroom)
 "Oxygen" (Nik Kershaw)
 "Love Hurts" (Boudleaux Bryant)
 "Bohemian Rhapsody" (Freddie Mercury)
 "One Night in Bangkok" (Benny Andersson/Björn Ulvaeus/Tim Rice)
 "He's Out of My Life" (Tom Bahler)
 "True Colours" (Billy Steinberg/Tom Kelly)
 "Radio Ga Ga" (Roger Taylor)
 "What'll I Do/Who" (Irving Berlin/Jerome Kern/Otto Harbach/Oscar Hammerstein II)
 "I Only Have Eyes for You" (Al Dubin/Harry Warren)
 "Well Almost" (Mike Chapman/Holly Knight)
 "Don't Cry for Me Argentina" (Tim Rice/Andrew Lloyd Webber)
 "I Know Him So Well" (Benny Andersson/Björn Ulvaeus/Tim Rice)
 "Memory" (Andrew Lloyd Webber/T. S. Eliot/Trevor Nunn)

Musicians

Elaine Paige - vocals
Ian Wherry - musical director, keyboards
Pete Zorn - guitar

Production credits

Producer and director - John G. Smith
Executive producer - Deke Arlon
Soundtrack mixers - Ian Wherry, Bill Tansley and Peter Jones

Elaine Paige albums